Ameide is a city in the Dutch province of Utrecht. It is a part of the municipality of Vijfheerenlanden, and lies about 9 km southwest of IJsselstein.

Ameide received city rights in the 14th century.

Ameide was a separate municipality in the province of South Holland until 1986, when it became part of Zederik. When Zederik merged into the new municipality Vijfheerenlanden in 2019, it became a part of the province of Utrecht.

In 2001, the village of Ameide had 3087 inhabitants. The built-up area of the village was 0.58 km², and contained 1083 residences.
The statistical area "Ameide", which also can include the surrounding countryside, has a population of around 3040.

References

Former municipalities of South Holland
Populated places in Utrecht (province)
Vijfheerenlanden